O Baiano Fantasma (English: The Ghostly Bahian) is a 1984 Brazilian film directed by Denoy de Oliveira and stars José Dumont as Lambusca.

Cast 
José Dumont	...	Lambusca
Regina Dourado	...	Zuzu
Luiz Carlos Gomes	...	Antenor
Paulo Hesse	...	Remela
Rafael de Carvalho	...	Chico Peixeira
Sérgio Mamberti	...	Fortunato

Accolades 
Gramado Film Festival
Best Film 
Best Director (Denoy de Oliveira)
Best Actor (José Dumont)

References

External links 
O Baiano Fantasma on IMDb

Brazilian comedy films
1984 films
1980s Portuguese-language films